Plasnica is a village and seat of the municipality of Plasnica, North Macedonia.

Demographics
Plasnica has traditionally been a Macedonian Muslim (Torbeš) village.

As of the 2021 census, Plasnica had 2,115 residents with the following ethnic composition:
Turks 2,055
Persons for whom data are taken from administrative sources 57
Others 3

According to the 2002 census, the village had a total of 2,288 inhabitants. Ethnic groups in the village include:

Turks 2250
Macedonians 2
Albanians 7
Others 29

References

Villages in Plasnica Municipality
Macedonian Muslim villages
Turkish communities in North Macedonia